Brisbane City is an Australian rugby union football team based in Brisbane that competes in the National Rugby Championship (NRC). The team is one of two Queensland sides in the competition, the other being . Brisbane City is organised and managed by the Queensland Rugby Union (QRU), with the coaching and training programs utilised by the Queensland Reds being extended to players joining the team from the Reds and Queensland Premier Rugby teams.

The Brisbane City team in the NRC takes its identity from the metropolitan rugby team that has represented Brisbane for more than a century. The representative team's colours and a similar logo were inherited for the NRC. The Brisbane City uniform is yellow and blue, with a crest of the City Hall logo within Queensland Rugby's traditional 'Q' on the jersey's chest.

The NRC was launched in 2014, reinstating the national competition after the Australian Rugby Championship (ARC) was discontinued following the first season in 2007. The Brisbane City NRC team utilises existing QRU staffing roles and infrastructure, with the team's home ground and training base located at QRU's headquarters at Ballymore.

History
Brisbane's earliest recorded intercity football match under Rugby Union rules took place on 19 August 1878 when Brisbane FC played Ipswich FC. The teams played again three weeks later under Victorian Rules. This was five years before the foundation of the Northern Rugby Union (the NRU, which was later to become the QRU). In the early years of rugby in Queensland, teams from country areas such as Toowoomba, Rockhampton and Charters Towers were Brisbane's main on-field rivals.

Representative team
Brisbane representative sides have been selected from the premier clubs in the city's competition for more than a hundred years to play teams from other areas of Queensland as well as international and provincial touring sides. A Brisbane Metropolitan side played the visiting British Isles team in 1904, and later Brisbane representative teams played the All Blacks in 1951 and Fiji in 1954.

The first City-Country rugby match between Brisbane and Queensland Country (selected from the rest of Queensland) was held at the inaugural Country Week carnival hosted by the QRU in 1902. Country Week carnivals became sporadic with the rise of rugby league after 1909, and the start of the First World War brought rugby union to a halt in Queensland in 1914. The QRU was revived in 1928–29, but rugby languished in country regions of the state for many years.

City-Country matches were resumed in 1965. From 1968 until 1982, annual Country Carnival competitions were held from which the Country team was selected to play Brisbane and other representative sides. The Country Carnival was discontinued in favour of State Championships in 1983, and the format of competition has varied over time, but City-Country matches between representative teams from Brisbane and Queensland Country have remained regular fixtures since.

Ballymore Tornadoes (ARC team)

In 2006, after setting up a consultative process culminating in a working session of some 70 delegates from around the country, the Australian Rugby Union announced that a new, eight-team national competition would commence in 2007 to compete for the Australian Rugby Championship (ARC).

The Ballymore Tornadoes was the Brisbane-based team in the ARC, and the team played its home matches at Ballymore Stadium. The team's colours were maroon, blue and silver. The Ballymore Tornadoes side was one of two Queensland teams supported by the QRU in the competition, alongside the East Coast Aces.

Queensland's two teams in the ARC were aligned with existing clubs and regions. The Tornadoes were aligned with six Queensland Premier Rugby clubs north of the Brisbane River – Brothers, GPS, Norths/QUT, Sunshine Coast, University and Wests. Chris Roche, a former Wallaby who played 17 Tests as well as 49 matches for the Reds during the 1980s, was the head coach of the Tornadoes. Paul Healy was the assistant coach.

The Australian Rugby Championship was terminated at the end of 2007 after only one season of competition, with the Australian Rugby Union citing higher costs than budgeted and further projected financial losses. The Tornadoes team was disbanded with the end of the ARC competition.

National Rugby Championship

In December 2013, the ARU announced that the national competition was to be relaunched, with the National Rugby Championship (NRC) commencing in 2014. Expressions of interest were open to any interested parties, with the accepted bids finalised in early 2014. There was initial interest from Brisbane clubs in forming NRC teams themselves, but to eliminate the risks to sub-unions and clubs the Queensland Rugby Union decided to organise and manage two teams centrally for the first year of the competition. On 24 March 2014, it was announced that the Brisbane City and Queensland Country teams would play in the NRC competition.

Brisbane City secured McInnes Wilson Lawyers as principal sponsor for the 2014 NRC season.

Stadium
The home ground for the Brisbane City team is Ballymore. The stadium was built in 1966 and is the traditional home of Queensland Rugby. The Queensland Reds played their home matches in the Super Rugby competition at Ballymore until the end of the 2005 season, before they moved to the larger Suncorp Stadium for 2006. Ballymore has a capacity of around 24,000. Test matches have also been played at Ballymore, including Bledisloe Cup matches, and a semi-final of the 1987 Rugby World Cup.

Brisbane City also played a home game at Suncorp Stadium in 2014, as the curtain raiser to the Bledisloe Cup match.

Current squad

Records

Honours
National Rugby Championship
Champions (2): 2014, 2015
Horan-Little Shield
Season winners: 2015

Season standings
National Rugby Championship
{| class="wikitable" style="text-align:center;"
|- border=1 cellpadding=5 cellspacing=0
! style="width:20px;"|Year
! style="width:20px;"|Pos
! style="width:20px;"|Pld
! style="width:20px;"|W
! style="width:20px;"|D
! style="width:20px;"|L
! style="width:20px;"|F
! style="width:20px;"|A
! style="width:25px;"|+/-
! style="width:20px;"|BP
! style="width:20px;"|Pts
! style="width:25em; text-align:left;"|  Play-offs
|-
|2018
|5th
| 7 || 4 || 0 || 3 || 205 || 245 || −40 || 2 || 18
|align=left|  Did not compete
|-
|2017
|6th
| 8 || 4 || 1 || 3 || 281 || 291 || –10 || 2 || 20
|align=left|  Did not compete
|-
|2016
|7th
| 7 || 2 || 0 || 5 || 216 || 306 || −90 || 1 || 9
|align=left|  Did not compete
|-
|2015
|1st
| 8 || 8 || 0 || 0 || 400 || 174 ||+226 || 6 || 38
|-
|2014
|3rd
| 8 || 6 || 0 || 2 || 295 || 257 || +38  || 2 || 26
|}

Australian Rugby Championship (Tornadoes)
{| class="wikitable"
|- border=1 cellpadding=5 cellspacing=0
! style="width:20px;"|Year
! style="width:20px;"|Pos
! style="width:20px;"|Pld
! style="width:20px;"|W
! style="width:20px;"|D
! style="width:20px;"|L
! style="width:20px;"|F
! style="width:20px;"|A
! style="width:25px;"|+/-
! style="width:20px;"|BP
! style="width:20px;"|Pts
! style="width:25em; text-align:left;"|  Play-offs
|- align=center
|align=left|2007
|align=left|7th
| 8 || 2 || 0 || 6 || 180 || 229 || -49 || 3 || 11
|align=left|  Did not compete
|}

Head coaches
 Jim McKay (2019–present)
 Mick Heenan (2017–2018)
 Rod Seib (2016)
 Nick Stiles (2014–2015)

Captains
 Fraser McReight (2019–present)
 Adam Korczyk (2018)
 Andrew Ready (2017)
 Sam Talakai (2016)
 Liam Gill (2015)
 David McDuling (2014)

Squads
{| class="collapsible collapsed" style=" width: 100%; margin: 0px; border: 1px solid darkgray; border-spacing: 3px;"
|-
! colspan="10" style="background-color:#f2f2f2; cell-border:2px solid black; padding-left: 1em; padding-right: 1em; text-align: center;" |2016 Brisbane City squad – NRC
|-
|colspan="10"|The squad for the 2016 National Rugby Championship:

|-
| width="3%"| 
| width="30%" style="font-size: 95%;" valign="top"|

Props
 Feao Fotuaika
 Tonga Ma’afu
 Pettowa Paraka
 Sam Talakai (c)
 Markus Vanzati

Hookers
 Matt Mafi
 Andrew Ready

Locks
 Kane Douglas1
 David Findlay-Henaway
 Jeremiah Lynch
 Brendan Mitchell
 Lukhan Tui

| width="3%"| 
| width="30%" style="font-size: 95%;" valign="top"|

Loose Forwards
 Luke Beauchamp
 Jack de Guingand
 Michael Gunn
 Leroy Houston
 Isi Naisarani
 Tuaina Tualima
 Criff Tupou

Scrum-halves
 Nick Frisby1
 Harry Nucifora
 Moses Sorovi

Fly-halves
 Jake McIntyre
 Jake Strachan

| width="3%"| 
| width="30%" style="font-size: 95%;" valign="top"|

Centres
 Levi Aumua
 Samu Kerevi1
 Nathan Russell
 Toby White

Wingers
 Alex Gibbon
 Chris Kuridrani
 Brad Lacey
 Junior Laloifi

Fullbacks
 Karmichael Hunt
 Patrick James

Notes:(c) Team captainBold denotes internationally capped players at the time1 National player additional to contracted squad.WTS Wider Training Squad.
|}

{| class="collapsible collapsed" style=" width: 100%; margin: 0px; border: 1px solid darkgray; border-spacing: 3px;"
|-
! colspan="10" style="background-color:#f2f2f2; cell-border:2px solid black; padding-left: 1em; padding-right: 1em; text-align: center;" |2015 Brisbane City squad – NRC
|-
|colspan="10"|The squad for the 2015 National Rugby Championship season:

|-
| width="3%"| 
| width="30%" style="font-size: 95%;" valign="top"|

Props
 Feao Fotuaika
 Ryan Freeney
 Pettowa Paraka
 Sam Talakai
 Benroy SalaWTS
 Markus Vanzati

Hookers
 Alex Casey
 Matt Mafi
 Andrew Ready

Locks
 James Horwill1
 Ben Hyne
 James Moore
 Caderyn Neville
 Corey Thomas

| width="3%"| 
| width="30%" style="font-size: 95%;" valign="top"|

Loose Forwards
 Luke Beauchamp
 Liam Gill (c)
 Scott Higginbotham1
 Adam Korczyk
 Chazz Mahina
 Ted PostalWTS
 Michael Richards
 Waita Setu
 Criff Tupou

Scrum-halves
 Nick Frisby
 Will Genia1
 Moses Sorovi
 Tim Smith

Fly-halves
 James Dalgleish
 Jake McIntyre
 Quade Cooper1

| width="3%"| 
| width="30%" style="font-size: 95%;" valign="top"|

Centres
 Karmichael Hunt
 Samu Kerevi
 Henry Taefu
 Toby White

Wingers
 Alex Gibbon
 Chris Kuridrani
 Junior Laloifi
 James O'Connor
 Mika Tela

Fullbacks
 Patrick James
 Andrew MuirheadWTS

Notes:(c) Team captainBold denotes internationally capped players at the time1 National player additional to contracted squad.WTS Wider Training Squad.
|}

{| class="collapsible collapsed" style=" width: 100%; margin: 0px; border: 1px solid darkgray; border-spacing: 3px;"
|-
! colspan="10" style="background-color:#f2f2f2; cell-border:2px solid black; padding-left: 1em; padding-right: 1em; text-align: center;" |2014 Brisbane City squad – NRC
|-
|colspan="10"|The squad for the 2014 National Rugby Championship season:

|-
| width="3%"| 
| width="30%" style="font-size: 95%;" valign="top"|

Props
 Sef Fa'agase
 David Feao
 Phil Kite
 Pettowa Paraka
 Sam Talakai

Hookers
 James Hanson
 Matthew Mafi
 Andrew Ready

Locks
 Tim Buchanan
 Daniel Gorman
 James Horwill1
 Marco Kotze
 David McDuling (c)
 Sam Rochester

| width="3%"| 
| width="30%" style="font-size: 95%;" valign="top"|

Loose Forwards
 Curtis Browning
 Michael Gunn
 Adam Korczyk
 Chazz Mahina
 Jake Schatz
 Brad Wilkin

Scrum-halves
 Nick Frisby
 Will Genia1
 Jack Mullins
 Will Thompson

Fly-halves
 Quade Cooper
 James Dalgleish
 Sam Greene
 Jake McIntyre

| width="3%"| 
| width="30%" style="font-size: 95%;" valign="top"|

Centres
 Samu Kerevi
 Ben Tapuai
 Toby White

Wingers
 Chris Kuridrani
 Junior Laloifi
 Harry Parker
 Rex Tapuai
 Lachie Turner

Fullbacks
 Matthew Feaunati
 Brando Va'aulu

Notes:(c) Team captainBold denotes internationally capped players at the time1 National player additional to contracted squad.WTS Wider Training Squad.
|}

{| class="collapsible collapsed" style=" width: 100%; margin: 0px; border: 1px solid darkgray; border-spacing: 3px;"
|-
! colspan="10" style="background-color:#f2f2f2; cell-border:2px solid black; padding-left: 1em; padding-right: 1em; text-align: center;" |2007 Ballymore Tornadoes squad – ARC
|-
| width="3%"| 
| width="30%" style="font-size: 95%;" valign="top"|

Props
 Ben Coutts
 Greg Holmes
 Peter Loane
 Brett Naylor
 Shon Siemonek
 Ernest Skelton

Hookers
 Geoff Abram
 Sean Hardman
 Joshua Mann-Rea

Locks
 Jared Hanna
 James Horwill
 Tristan Hill
 Daniel Linde
 Ed O'Donoghue

| width="3%"| 
| width="30%" style="font-size: 95%;" valign="top"|

Loose Forwards
 Leroy Houston
 Steve Miller
 Tom McVerry
 Ray Stowers
 Scott Higginbotham
 Charles Wyllie

Scrum-halves
 Sam Cordingley
 Will Genia
 Brendan McKibbin

Fly-halves
 David Collis
 Berrick Barnes
 Peter Hynes

| width="3%"| 
| width="30%" style="font-size: 95%;" valign="top"|

Centres
 Blair Connor
 Brett Gillespie
 Byron Roberts
 Tim Sampson
 Donovan Slade

Wings
 Paul Doneley
 Elia Tuqiri
 Anthony Sauer

Fullbacks
 Clinton Schifcofske

Notes:(c) Team captainBold denotes internationally capped players at the time
|}

Gallery

See also

 Queensland Reds
 Queensland Premier Rugby
 Rugby union in Queensland

References

Sources

External links
Brisbane City official web page
NRC on redsrugby.com
Brisbane City on twitter.com

 

National Rugby Championship
Rugby union teams in Queensland
Sporting clubs in Brisbane
Rugby clubs established in 2014
2014 establishments in Australia
Rugby union clubs disestablished in 2020
2020 disestablishments in Australia